The fourth and final season of Haikyu!! anime television series, titled , is produced by Production I.G. and Masako Satō replaced Susumu Mitsunaka as director, with the returning staff from the previous seasons. The season was announced at the Jump Festa '19 event, with a "kickoff event" for the new series being held on September 22, 2019. It adapted the first half of "Tokyo Nationals" (chapters 207–292) story arc from the original manga series of the same name written by Haruichi Furudate. The fourth season premiered on January 11, 2020 on the Super Animeism block. It ran for 25 episodes, with the first cour running weekly from January 11 to April 4, 2020; the second cour was supposed to air in July 2020 but was delayed due to the COVID-19 pandemic. The second cour aired from October 3 to December 19, 2020. Crunchyroll simulcasted the fourth season.

The series uses four pieces of theme music: two opening themes and two ending themes. From episodes 1-13, the opening theme is "Phoenix" by Burnout Syndromes while the ending theme is "Kessen Spirit" by CHiCO with HoneyWorks. From episodes 14 through 25, the opening theme is "Toppako" by SUPER BEAVER while the ending theme is "One Day" by SPYAIR.



Episode list

References

2020 Japanese television seasons
Haikyu!! episode lists
Haikyu!!
Anime postponed due to the COVID-19 pandemic